"Everything You Need" is a song by Australian electronic music duo Madison Avenue, released on 18 September 2000. The single was a top-10 hit in Australia and Hungary, reaching number six in both nations, but did not continue the group's success in the United Kingdom, where it reached number 33. On the US Billboard Hot Dance Club Play chart, the song peaked at number 24.

Track listings
Australian CD single
 "Everything You Need" (original mix edit)
 "Everything You Need" (Mobin Master Remix edit)
 "Don't Call Me Baby" (Armin van Buuren Stalker Mix)
 "Everything You Need" (original 12-inch mix)

UK CD single
 "Everything You Need" (original mix edit)
 "Everything You Need" (Olav Basoski Remix)
 "Everything You Need" (King Unique Mix)

UK 12-inch single
A1. "Everything You Need" (Olav Basoski Remix)
A2. "Everything You Need" (original mix edit)
B2. "Everything You Need" (King Unique Mix)

UK cassette single
 "Everything You Need" (original mix edit) – 3:53
 "Don't Call Me Baby" (The Dronez Old Skool Mix) – 5:51
 "Who the Hell Are You" (John Course vs Andy Van Remix) – 7:20

Charts

Weekly charts

Year-end charts

Certifications

Release history

References

2000 singles
2000 songs
Madison Avenue (band) songs
Songs written by Andy Van Dorsselaer
Songs written by Cheyne Coates